Brachaluteres ulvarum, known commonly as the Japanese inflator filefish  , is a species of marine fish in the family Monacanthidae.

The Japanese inflator filefish is an endemic species living in the south of Japan.

It's a small size fish that can reach a maximum size of 7,5 cm length.

References

External links

Tetraodontiformes
Fish described in 1902